Gibson's may refer to:

Gibson's Discount Center, a defunct American retail chain
Gibson's Finest, a Canadian whisky brand

See also
Gibsons, a town in British Columbia, Canada
Gibson (disambiguation)